The 2019 Campeonato Paranaense de Futebol was the 105th edition of the top division of football in the state of Paraná. The competition started on 19 January and ended on 21 April, and was organized by FPF.

The defending champions, Athletico Paranaense, won on penalties their 25th title after beating Toledo in the final.

Format
The 12 participants were split into two groups of six, Group A and Group B, and competed in two separate tournaments.

In the first tournament, each team in Group A played the six teams in Group B once, and vice versa. The best two in each group advanced to a knockout bracket, where the best team in each group played the second-best team in each group in a single leg in the semifinals.

In the second tournament, each team played every other team in their group once, and the best two in each group advanced to a knockout bracket. The best team in each group played the second-best team in the opposite group in a single leg in the semifinals.

The winners of each tournament played in a two-legged final to determine the champion. If the same team won both tournaments, the final would not be contested. After both tournaments have been played, the points totals from each tournament were added up, and the bottom two teams were relegated to the second division. Four places were available in the 2020 Copa do Brasil, while two places (via Campeonato Paranaense) were available in the 2020 Série D.

Participating teams

Taça Barcímio Sucipira Júnior
Group A

Group B

Knockout stage

Taça Dirceu Krüger
Group A

Group B

Knockout stage

Grand Final

General table

Top goalscorers

References

Paranaense